is a passenger railway station located in the town of Yokoze, Saitama, Japan, operated by the private railway operator Seibu Railway.

Lines

Station layout
The station consists of one island platform serving two tracks, connected to the station building by an underground passage.

Platforms

History
The station opened on 14 October 1969.

Station numbering was introduced on all Seibu Railway lines during fiscal 2012, with Ashigakubo Station becoming "SI34".

Passenger statistics
In fiscal 2019, the station was the 90th busiest on the Seibu network with an average of 340 passengers daily. The passenger figures for previous years are as shown below.

Surrounding area
 
Ashikagakubo Post Office
Yokose River

See also
 List of railway stations in Japan

References

External links

 Seibu Railway station information

Railway stations in Saitama Prefecture
Railway stations in Japan opened in 1969
Seibu Chichibu Line
Stations of Seibu Railway
Yokoze, Saitama